Bad Bleiberg is a market town in the district of Villach-Land, in Carinthia, Austria. Originally a mining area, especially for lead, Bad Bleiberg today due to its hot springs is a spa town.

Geography
Bad Bleiberg is situated west of the district's capital Villach in a high valley on the northern slope of the Dobratsch (Villacher Alpe) massif, the easternmost part of the Gailtal Alps mountain range.

The municipal area comprises the cadastral communities of Bleiberg proper and Kreuth.

History
King Henry II of Germany granted the Carinthian lands around Villach to the newly created Diocese of Bamberg at the Frankfurt synod of 1 November 1007, together with other estates like Griffen or the Canal Valley around Tarvisio. When under Emperor Frederick II Bamberg was elevated to a Prince-Bishopric, the territories became ecclesiastical exclaves within the territory of the Carinthian dukes. In 1759 the Bamberg estates were finally acquired by Empress Maria Theresa and incorporated into Habsburg Carinthia.

The mine was first mentioned as Pleyberg in a 1333 deed issued by the Bamberg bishops; it was operated by the Swabian Fugger family from the late 15th century onwards. Georgius Agricola described the mining and smelting of lead and zinc in his 1556 book De re metallica. Mining operations ceased in 1993 for economic reasons, today a tourist mine offers guided underground tours.

The current municipality was established in 1850, it received the status of a market town in 1930. When in 1951 a hot spring had flooded an adit, a public bath was established and Bleiberg received the official Bad title of a spa town in 1978.

Politics
Seats in the municipal assembly (Gemeinderat) as of 2015 local elections:
Independent List Bad Bleiberg (ULB): 10
Social Democratic Party of Austria (SPÖ): 7
Freedom Party of Austria (FPö): 1
The Greens – The Green Alternative: 1

Twin town
 Pradamano, Italy

Notable people
Oskar Potiorek (1853–1933), Austro-Hungarian army officer

References

Cities and towns in Villach-Land District
Gailtal Alps
Spa towns in Austria